Saint-Jean-d'Elle is a commune in the department of Manche, northwestern France. The municipality was established on 1 January 2016 by merger of the former communes of Notre-Dame-d'Elle, Précorbin, Rouxeville, Saint-Jean-des-Baisants (the seat) and Vidouville.

See also 
Communes of the Manche department

References  

Communes of Manche
Populated places established in 2016
2016 establishments in France